"Bubblegum" is the first single from B.G. & the Chopper City Boyz's second album, Life in the Concrete Jungle. The song was officially released on July 8, 2008 and features Lady Dolla and is produced by Joe Blow da CEO.

Music video
A video has been shot, and has been seen widely around the internet.

Track listing
CD single
 "Bubblegum" (Explicit)

References

2008 singles
B.G. (rapper) songs
2008 songs